This is a list of notable events in country music that took place in the year 1993.

Events
 December 28 – Newcomer Shania Twain and record producer and songwriter Robert John "Mutt" Lange are married. Twain had just released her first album, produced by Norro Wilson earlier in the year, and although it gained largely positive critical reviews, the album was not a big seller. Twain, hiring Lange as her producer, will quickly begin work to improve her fortunes exponentially.

Top hits of the year

Singles released by American artists

Singles released by Canadian artists

Top new album releases

Other top albums

On television

Regular series
 Hee Haw (1969–1993, syndicated)

Specials

Births
March 24 – Mo Pitney, country singer who released his first radio hit, "Country".
May 13 – William Michael Morgan, young country singer who released his first radio hit, "I Met a Girl".
May 13 – Morgan Wallen, performer of the 2010s ("Whiskey Glasses").
September 12 – Kelsea Ballerini, country pop singer-songwriter known for her 2014 debut hit "Love Me Like You Mean It".
October 9 – Scotty McCreery, winner of the 10th season of American Idol, with follow-up successes including "I Love You This Big" and his first No. 1 hit, "Five More Minutes".
October 9 – Chase Bryant, up-and-coming singer of the mid-2010s, including "Take It On Back" and "Little Bit of You."
October 21 – Kane Brown, country music singer and songwriter who released his radio hit, "Used to Love You Sober".

Deaths
June 5 — Conway Twitty, 59, giant music star since the 1950s who set records for most No. 1 country hits until 2006 (abdominal aneurysm).
November 30 — David Houston, 57, top country singer of the 1960s and early 1970s, best known for "Almost Persuaded" (brain aneurysm).

Hall of Fame inductees

Bluegrass Music Hall of Fame inductees
Mac Wiseman
Jim & Jesse
Jim McReynolds
Jesse McReynolds

Country Music Hall of Fame inductees
Willie Nelson (born 1933)

Canadian Country Music Hall of Fame inductees
Ward Allen
Stu Phillips
Bob Nolan
Stu Davis
Ted Daigle
Frank Jones

Major awards

Grammy Awards
Best Female Country Vocal Performance — "Passionate Kisses", Mary Chapin Carpenter
Best Male Country Vocal Performance — "Ain't That Lonely Yet", Dwight Yoakam
Best Country Performance by a Duo or Group with Vocal — "Hard Workin' Man", Brooks & Dunn
Best Country Collaboration with Vocals — "Does He Love You", Reba McEntire and Linda Davis
Best Country Instrumental Performance — "Red Wing", Asleep at the Wheel, Chet Atkins, Eldon Shamblin, Johnny Gimble, Marty Stuart, Reuben "Lucky Oceans" Gosfield & Vince Gill
Best Country Song — "Passionate Kisses", Lucinda Williams (Performer: Mary Chapin Carpenter)
Best Bluegrass Album — Waitin' for the Hard Times to Go, The Nashville Bluegrass Band

Juno Awards
Country Male Vocalist of the Year — Charlie Major
Country Female Vocalist of the Year — Cassandra Vasik
Country Group or Duo of the Year — The Rankin Family

Academy of Country Music
Entertainer of the Year — Garth Brooks
Song of the Year — "I Love the Way You Love Me", Victoria Shaw and Chuck Cannon (Performer: John Michael Montgomery)
Single of the Year — "Chattahoochee", Alan Jackson
Album of the Year — A Lot About Livin' (And a Little 'Bout Love), Alan Jackson
Top Male Vocalist — Vince Gill
Top Female Vocalist — Wynonna
Top Vocal Duo — Brooks & Dunn
Top Vocal Group — Little Texas
Top New Male Vocalist — John Michael Montgomery
Top New Female Vocalist — Faith Hill
Top New Vocal Duo or Group — Gibson/Miller Band
Video of the Year — "We Shall Be Free," Garth Brooks (Directors: Garth Brooks and Tim Miller)

ARIA Awards 
(presented in Sydney on April 14, 1993)
Best Country Album – The Outback Club (Lee Kernaghan)

Canadian Country Music Association
Bud Country Fans' Choice Award — Michelle Wright
Male Artist of the Year — George Fox
Female Artist of the Year — Michelle Wright
Group or Duo of the Year — The Rankin Family
SOCAN Song of the Year — "Backroads", Charlie Major
Single of the Year — "He Would Be Sixteen", Michelle Wright
Album of the Year — Bad Day for Trains, Patricia Conroy
Top Selling Album — Some Gave All, Billy Ray Cyrus
Video of the Year — "He Would Be Sixteen", Michelle Wright
Vista Rising Star Award — The Rankin Family
Vocal Collaboration of the Year — Cassandra Vasik and Russell deCarle

Country Music Association
Entertainer of the Year — Vince Gill
Song of the Year — "I Still Believe in You", Vince Gill and John Barlow Jarvis (Performer: Vince Gill)
Single of the Year — "Chattahoochee", Alan Jackson
Album of the Year — I Still Believe in You, Vince Gill
Male Vocalist of the Year — Vince Gill
Female Vocalist of the Year — Mary Chapin Carpenter
Vocal Duo of the Year — Brooks & Dunn
Vocal Group of the Year — Diamond Rio
Horizon Award — Mark Chesnutt
Music Video of the Year — "Chattahoochee", Alan Jackson (Director: Martin Kahan)
Vocal Event of the Year — "I Don't Need Your Rockin' Chair", George Jones (featuring Clint Black, Garth Brooks, T. Graham Brown, Mark Chesnutt, Joe Diffie, Vince Gill, Alan Jackson, Patty Loveless, Pam Tillis and Travis Tritt)
Musician of the Year — Mark O'Connor

Further reading
Kingsbury, Paul, "The Grand Ole Opry: History of Country Music. 70 Years of the Songs, the Stars and the Stories," Villard Books, Random House; Opryland USA, 1995
Millard, Bob, "Country Music: 70 Years of America's Favorite Music," HarperCollins, New York, 1993
Whitburn, Joel, "Top Country Songs 1944–2005 – 6th Edition." 2005.

Other links
Country Music Association
Inductees of the Country Music Hall of Fame

External links
Country Music Hall of Fame

Country
Country music by year